Kunwara Baap is a 1974 Hindi film produced by Amarlal Chabria and directed by and starring Mehmood. The film also stars Bharathi, and Vinod Mehra. Based on Charlie Chaplin's The Kid (1921), it is a film with a serious message about polio vaccination.  However, Mehmood did some comedy scenes in the film to earn a Filmfare nomination as Best Comic, the only nomination for the film. Rajesh Roshan makes his debut as a film composer. The hijra song "Saj Rahi Gali" sung by Mohammed Rafi topped the annual Binaca Geet Mala, which was the only countdown show at the time. This film was Tamil actress Manorama's only film in Hindi, however, her lines consisted of some Tamil.

Plot 

Bharathi plays a deserted wife to Vinod Mehra. She abandons her newly born son outside of a temple where he is rescued by a rickshawala (Mehmood). The boy develops polio  and the rikshawala feels guilty after a doctor (Sanjeev Kumar) admonishes him. He takes care of the boy Macky Ali and loves him as his own. In the meantime, the boy's real-life parents reconcile and turn to a police officer (Vinod Khanna) for help in finding their missing son. when they find their child, the rikshawala does not want to give him up. The policeman urges him to do so, as the wealthy parents can pay for an operation that can help the boy walk again. He does sorrowfully. But the boy comes back with his parents to see the rikshawala die. The film ends with Mehmood, the actor, getting up and explaining to the audience that his death was for the camera, but polio is real and deadly and that people should get their children vaccinated. The Sports Day, a major scene in the movie, is shot in Bishop Cotton Boys' School

Mehmood made the film Kunwara Baap to raise awareness for polio, which had affected his own son, Macky Ali aka Maqdoom Ali. Macky was affected by polio since birth and made his debut starring in the film.  Kunwara Baap had special appearances from actors Mumtaz Ali (Mehmood's father), Sanjeev Kumar, Vinod Mehra, Amitabh Bachchan, Dharmendra, Vinod Khanna, Hema Malini, Dara Singh, Lalita Pawar, Yogita Bali and Mukri. It was also the debut film performance for music composer Rajesh Roshan.

Cast 

 Mehmood as Mahesh / Rickshaw Walla
 Bharathi as Radha
 Vinod Mehra
 Macky Ali as Hindustan
Manorama as Sheela
 Bhushan Tiwari as Kaloo Dada
Nazir Hussain as Bishop Cotton School's Principal
 Mumtaz Ali as Sheela's Father
 Abbas Ali as Beggar on the Bus Stop
 Mukri as Havaldar
 Sunder as Pandit

Guest appearance
Amitabh Bachchan as Anthony
Dharmendra as himself
Hema Malini as herself
Sanjeev Kumar as Doctor
Vinod Khanna as Inspector Ramesh
Yogeeta Bali as Fake Wife of Mahesh
Dara Singh as himself as Wrestler
Asit Sen as Ring Referee
Maruti as Dara Singh's Man at Arena
Lalita Pawar as Orphanage Matron
Lucky Ali as Child artist

Soundtrack

References

External links 
 

1974 films
Films scored by Rajesh Roshan
1970s Hindi-language films